Rashmini Paboda Sandeepani Pathirana, (born 16 January 1982) is a Sri Lankan cinema, theatre and television actress.

Background
Sandeepani is the daughter of Sri Lankan actress Geetha Kanthi Jayakody. Her aunt Rathna Lalani Jayakody and uncle Sampath Tennakoon are also well known artists in Sri Lanka. Popular actor Bimal Jayakody is the son of Geetha Kanthi's elder brother. Bimal is married to fellow actress Sujani Menaka.

When Paboda was just five years old, she acted in the teledrama Yashorawaya with her mother Geetha Kanthi. Then they acted together in teledrama Bopath Sakkiya. After 31 years, they acted together in the upcoming film Sri Saddha.

Career
She entered the film industry at a very young age with the help of his mother. Though she acted in few films, she gain more attraction with television serials. In 2000, she entered Sinhala cinema with an uncredited role in the film Sanda Yahanata. Her most popular cinema acting came through Udayakantha Warnasuriya's film Bahubuthayo in which she played as the leading female antagonist with two popular actors Mahendra Perera and Rodney Warnakula.

Notable television works

 Adarawanthayo
 Anantha
 Bopath Sakkiya
 Boralu Para
 Daangale
 Deydunu Yanaya
 Diyaniyo
 Ekas Ginna
 Gini Dalu Meda
 Handuna Gaththoth Oba Ma
 Isuru Bawana
 Kasee Salu 
 Mage Kaviya Mata Denna 
 Mal Hathai
 Mayura Asapuwa 
 Pabalu
 Pem Piyawara
 Peraliya
 Pingala Danawwa
 Sakarma 
 Saki
 Sakura Mal
 Sakuge Kathawa
 Samanala Sihinaya 
 Sanakeliyay Maya
 Sathmahala
 Sihina Genena Kumariye
 Sivpath Rena 
 Sooriya Wachchasa
 Thuththiri
 Tharupaba
 Wassanaye Hiru Evidin 
 Yashorawaya

Accolades
In 2011, Paboda won the Best Actress Awards for her leading role in the television serial Pingala Danawwa at the 7th Raigam Tele'es award ceremony. She also won best teledrama actress award at the 19th Sumathi Awards in 2014 for her role in television serial Boralu Para.

Filmography

References

External links

පුතා ටිකක් ලොකු වුණාම මම රංගනයට යොමු වෙනවා
 ආදරය කරන කාලයේ

Living people
Sri Lankan film actresses
Sri Lankan television actresses
1982 births